Yunji Town is an urban town in Changshou District, Chongqing, People's Republic of China.

Administrative division
The town is divided into 11 villages, the following areas: Huazhong Village, Yulong Village, Leizu Village, Feilong Village, Wanshou Village, Fusheng Village, Dasheng Village, Manao Village, Qingfeng Village, Datong Village, and Jianfeng Village (华中村、玉龙村、雷祖村、飞龙村、万寿村、福胜村、大胜村、玛瑙村、青丰村、大同村、尖锋村).

External links

Divisions of Changshou District
Culture in Chongqing
Towns in Chongqing